The 2023 New Zealand Grand Prix event for open wheel racing cars was held at Hampton Downs Motorsport Park in northern Waikato on 5 February 2022. It was the sixty-seventh New Zealand Grand Prix and utilised Formula Regional cars. The event also served as the third race of the fourth round of the 2023 Formula Regional Oceania Championship. This marked the Grand Prix's return after the 2022 iteration was cancelled due to the COVID-19 pandemic, and was the first to feature international drivers since 2020.

Dutch driver Laurens van Hoepen produced a shock victory in his debut weekend in the Formula Regional Oceania Championship. He won from the highly-fancied Louis Foster, with series leader Callum Hedge rounding out the podium.

Entry list 
All drivers compete with identical Tatuus FT-60 chassis cars powered by 2.0L turbocharged Toyota engines. After the 2021 Grand Prix was run without any officially recognized teams, the event returned to a team-based format.

Qualifying

Qualifying classification

Race

Race classification

References

New Zealand Grand Prix
New Zealand Grand Prix
New Zealand Grand Prix